The Edward Warner Award is an award that's given in the field of aviation to aviation pioneers or organizations that have contributed to civil aviation. The award is named after Edward Pearson Warner, the first President of the council of ICAO.

The award consists of two items: a medal and a certificate. The medal is made of solid gold and is inscribed with the recipient's name. The certificate is a recognition citing the reasons for the award. The Edward Warner Award is recognized throughout the world as the greatest single honour the international civil aviation community can bestow, for its importance is derived from the fact that it is given by ICAO on behalf of its Member States. No other international civil aviation award offers such wide recognition.

Recipients 
 1959: Albert Plesman 
 1961: International Aeronautical Federation
 1963: Max Hymans 
 1965: William Hildred 
 1968: Henri Bouché 
 1971:  
 1972: ASECNA, Agence pour la Sécurité de la Navigation aérienne en Afrique et à Madagascar
 1973: Shizuma Matsuo 
 1974: Alex Meyer 
 1975: Charles Lindbergh 
 1976: COCESNA, Corporación Centroamericana de Servicios de Navegación Aérea
 1977: Mohammed Soliman El Hakim 
 1978: Don Anderson 
 1979: Agnar Kofoed-Hansen 
 1980: Indalecio Rego Fernandez 
 1981: Harry George Armstrong 
 1982: Werner Guldimann 
 1983:  
 1984: Maurice Bellonte 
 1985: Alexandr Fedotovich Aksenov 
 1986: J.R.D. Tata 
 1988: Aeronautical Radio of Thailand (AEROTHAI) 
 1989: Anesia Pinheiro Machado 
 1990: Igor Ivanovich Sikorsky 
 1991: Bill Bradfield 
 1992: Edward R. K. Dwemoh 
 1993: Arnold W. G. Kean 
 1994: B. J. Habibie 
 1995: Elrey Borge Jeppesen 
 1996: The Institute of Air and Space Law of McGill University 
 1997: Tatiana Anodina 
 1998: Kenneth Rattray 
 1999: Jerome F. Lederer 
 2000: Singapore Aviation Academy (SAA) 
 2001: Petro Balabuyev 
 2002: International Academy of Aviation and Space Medicine (IAASM)
 2004: Brian O'Keeffe 
 2007: Silvio Finkelstein 
 2010: Nicolas Mateesco Matte 
 2013: Assad Kotaite 
 2016: David Ronald de Mey Warren 
 2019: Roberto Kobeh González 
 2022: Ángela Marina Donato

See also
 List of aviation awards

References

External links 
The Edward Warner Award A Commemoration of Greatness - icao.int

Aviation awards